KDSS (92.7 FM) is a radio station licensed to serve Ely, Nevada.  The station is owned by Coates Broadcasting, Inc.  It airs a country music format.

The station was assigned the KDSS call letters by the Federal Communications Commission on December 8, 1992.

Programming
In addition to its usual music format, programming on KDSS includes Takin’ it Outside, a short program about "living and playing in the Southwestern Outdoors" hosted by Doug Nielsen.

Ownership
On November 30, 2007, Patrick Dennis Coates died at the age of 67.  A resident of Ely since 1996, Coates and his wife, Samantha J. Coates, jointly owned 100 percent of privately held Coates Broadcasting, Inc.  Samantha Coates died on September 1, 2009 at the age of 72. Ownership of the station and Coates Broadcasting, Inc. has since passed to Karen Livingston, daughter of Patrick and Samantha Coates.

References

External links
KDSS 92.7 Jack FM Facebook

 KDSS station website

DSS
Country radio stations in the United States
Radio stations established in 1989